The Kawasaki Ki-56 (Type 1 Freight Transport) was a Japanese two-engine light transport aircraft used during World War II. It was known to the Allies by the reporting name "Thalia". 121 were built between 1940 and 1943.

Design and development
The Kawasaki Ki-56 was derived from the Lockheed Model 14 Super Electra aircraft that the Kawasaki Kokuki Kogyo Kabushiki Kaisha (The Kawasaki Aircraft Engineering Company Limited) had built under licence. In September 1939 Kawasaki was asked by the Koku Hombu to design an improved version as Ki-56. A number was also built by Tachikawa Hikoki K.K.

Operational history
The Japanese invasion of Sumatra in the Dutch East Indies campaign began with a paratroop drop from Ki-56 transports on Airfield P1 and the oil refineries near Palembang. Royal Air Force Hawker Hurricane fighters flying from P1 to locate the Japanese invasion fleet passed the incoming Ki-56s, but thought them to be friendly Lockheed Hudsons (also developed from the Lockheed Model 14) returning from a raid. The defending anti-aircraft gunners at P1 were equally fooled, until the parachutes began to open. Once the AA guns opened fire one transport was shot down, another force-landed, and others veered off course, but the paratroop drop was effective and the airfield and oil installations were overrun.

Specifications (Ki-56)

See also

References
Notes

Bibliography

External links

 Pilot Friend

Ki-056, Kawasaki
World War II Japanese transport aircraft
Ki-056
Twin piston-engined tractor aircraft
Twin-tail aircraft